Antti Aukusti Hiltula (23 January 1854 – 21 April 1928) was a Finnish farmer and politician. He was born in Pudasjärvi, and was a Member of the Parliament of Finland from 1907 to 1909, representing the Finnish Party.

References

1854 births
1928 deaths
People from Pudasjärvi
People from Oulu Province (Grand Duchy of Finland)
Finnish Party politicians
Members of the Parliament of Finland (1907–08)
Members of the Parliament of Finland (1908–09)